Omus is a genus of tiger beetles, subfamily Cicindelinae. Its members are dark colored, nocturnal, and flightless. All members occur along the west coast of North America.

Species
 Omus audouini Reiche, 1838
 Omus californicus Eschscholtz, 1829
 Omus cazieri Van den Berghe, 1994
 Omus dejeanii Reiche, 1838
 Omus submetallicus G. Horn, 1868

References

Bibliography
Tiger Beetles of Alberta: Killers on the Clay, Stalkers on the Sand by John Acorn. University of Alberta Press, 2001.
Tiger Beetles: The Evolution, Ecology, and Diversity of the Cicindelids by David L. Pearson and Alfried P. Vogler. Cornell University Press, 2001.
A Field Guide to the Tiger Beetles of the United States and Canada by David L. Pearson, C. Barry Knisley and Charles J. Kazilek.  Oxford University Press, 2005.

Cicindelidae
Beetles of North America